Chunibhai Kanjibhai Gohel (born 19 May 1955 Veravel district, GJ ) is an Indian politician of the Bharatiya Janata Party. Since April 2014, he is the member of the Parliament of India representing Gujarat State in the Rajya Sabha, the upper house.

References

Living people
1955 births
Bharatiya Janata Party politicians from Gujarat
Rajya Sabha members from Gujarat
People from Veraval
Rajya Sabha members from the Bharatiya Janata Party